Florida Glen is a small, primarily residential suburb on the eastern edge of the city of Roodepoort.
The N1 Freeway runs through Florida Glen, and intersects at the Gordon Road offramp. The main road through Florida Glen was Lange Ave, until the building of the N1 Freeway in the 1980s, which diverted traffic onto the busy Gordon Road. Hendrik Potgieter Road also passes through Florida Glen. Florida Glen is flanked by Quellerina to the north and Delarey to the south, Bergbron and Northcliff to the east, and Florida Hills, and Newlands to the west. For many years its residents were Afrikaans- and English-speaking white middle-class families. In the 1990s and following it became an attractive suburb for black, coloured and indian middle-class families from nearby Coronation, Newlands, Soweto and Lenasia, as it is easily accessible from the city and the N1 Freeway.
Florida Glen has no schools of its own, and there are few churches and community centres - notably the NG Kerk Florida Glen which is visible from the Western Bypass, with its large steel spire.

In the early 1980s a small shopping mall was built at the intersection of Lange Avenue and Gordon Road called "the Glen". It houses a number of small community shops including a Spar, liquor store, green-grocer, DVD-rental store and hardware store.

References

Johannesburg Region B